Vital L'Hoste (6 June 1925 – 26 March 2011) was a Belgian boxer. He competed in the men's light heavyweight event at the 1948 Summer Olympics.

References

External links
 

1925 births
2011 deaths
Belgian male boxers
Olympic boxers of Belgium
Boxers at the 1948 Summer Olympics
Sportspeople from Walloon Brabant
Light-heavyweight boxers